Sir William Bellingham, 1st Baronet (c. 1756 – 27 October 1826) was an Irish-born British politician and the Controller of Storekeepers Accounts  for the Royal Navy. Bellingham was charged with organizing and procuring provisions for the Vancouver Expedition. Though he never saw the Pacific Ocean, Bellingham Bay and the city of Bellingham, Washington, are named for him.

Early life

William Bellingham was the son of Col. Alan Bellingham (of Castlebellingham) and Alice Montgomery, daughter of Rev. Hans Montgomery of Grey Abbey House, Co. Down. Bellingham was one of four siblings (O'Bryen, Thomas, and Alan).

He attended Trinity College, Dublin, graduating in 1778 as a Bachelor of Arts. In 1783 he married Hester Frances Cholmondeley (1763-1844), granddaughter of George Cholmondeley, 3rd Earl of Cholmondeley.

Career
Bellingham moved to Reigate, Surrey, and from 1784 through 1789 held the elected office of Member of Parliament in the House of Commons.

In 1789 he was appointed commissioner for the victualling of the Royal Navy,. on the 21 January 1790 he was appointed Controller of Storekeepers Accounts a post he held til 1793 when he was succeeded by Sir Frederick Rogers. During this time he oversaw the provisioning of George Vancouver's expedition  along the West Coast of North America. Bellingham Bay was named by Vancouver in his honor. Later the city of Bellingham, Washington was also named for him. He was the Receiver of the Sixpenny Office, an Admiralty fund that collected sixpence from every serving sailor's wage for the Greenwich Hospital.

He became the private secretary of the Right Honourable William Pitt, and was created a baronet, of Castle Bellingham on 19 April 1796. He was also a Fellow of the Society of Antiquaries and was Receiver General of the Land and Assessed Taxe of London.

He died in 1826 and was buried in the family vault at St Mary's Church of Ireland, Kilsaran Parish, in Castle Bellingham.

References

1750s births
1826 deaths
18th-century Irish people
19th-century Irish people
People from County Down
Alumni of Trinity College Dublin
Baronets in the Baronetage of Great Britain
British MPs 1784–1790
Politicians from County Louth
Fellows of the Society of Antiquaries of London
Members of the Parliament of Great Britain for English constituencies
History of Bellingham, Washington
People from Castlebellingham